The AASI Jetcruzer was an American single turboprop light civil transport made by Advanced Aerodynamics and Structures Inc. The Jetcruzer had an unusual configuration, with a single turboprop engine driving a pusher propeller, a prominent canard, and fins mounted at the ends of its swept wings. The plane has seating for up to six people including the pilot. The Jetcruzer is noteworthy for being the first aircraft to have achieved a spin resistance certification from the United States FAA.

Development

Jetcruzer 450
Design work on the Jetcruzer commenced in March 1983, with prototype construction starting in 1988. The aerodynamic design was undertaken in the UK by Sandy Burns from 1984-1985, layout prepared by Ladislao Pazmany, structural design undertaken by David Kent of Light Transport Design in the UK, and the wind tunnel test done by University of San Diego. Prototype construction started in June 1988 and was first exhibited at the NBAA show in October 1988 with a 420 horsepower Rolls-Royce 250-C20S engine. The Allison 250-C20S prototype first flew on January 11, 1989. This initial version, designated the Jetcruzer 450 seated six people (including the pilot). The first flight of the Jetcruzer 450 forerunner was 11 January 1989 (N5369M). Preproduction prototype (N102JC) made its first flight in April 1991 while the first flight on production form (N450JC) was done on September 13 1992.  

It received its Federal Aviation Regulations Part 23 certification on 14 June, 1994, and was intending on receiving a single-engine FAA Part 135 public transport IFR certification Three prototypes were built, but AASI chose not to market this aircraft, in order to focus on more advanced versions. A spin recovery system for use in the flight test program was designed for the aircraft by Butler Parachute Systems which also worked on one for the Sino Swearingen SJ-30.

Jetcruzer 500
The first version developed from the 450 was the Jetcruzer 500, a slightly stretched version powered by a Pratt & Whitney Canada PT6A-66A featuring cabin pressurization. Two of the model 450 prototypes were converted to this configuration. The prototype Jetcruzer 500 (N102JC) made its first flight on August 22, 1997 with the second prototype (N200JC) making its first flight on 7 November 1997. The first public appearance was at NBAA Las Vegas October 1998. The third prototype (N136JC) of the new build was scheduled to be flown in early 2000. This was the version selected for production, and at one point, AASI had orders for some 200 aircraft at $US 1.6 million each. A military version, the ML-2 had also been offered, as well as a UAV, the ML-1.

None of these orders would be filled, however, as the Jetcruzer 500 remained uncertified and its development slowly stagnated. Specific problems with the aircraft's noise, high stall speed, and center of gravity were not overcome before all work on it was suspended in 2002. Nearly 20 years of work had still not resulted in a marketable aircraft.

Jetcruzer 650
In December 1992, construction work began on the prototype of an even larger variant, the Jetcruzer 650, which was to seat up to thirteen. This was quickly abandoned as the company's financial problems required resources to be focused on the 500. A military version would have been the ML-4.

Stratocruzer 1250
Similarly, a turbofan-powered version was planned as the Stratocruzer 1250, but never left the drawing board. Design work had started in September 1991 to provide a business jet with intercontinental range. A military version, the ML-5 intended for surveillance duties, was also planned. Work was abandoned after AASI failed to attract financial backers for the project in 1995.

Post AASI Era

In November 2003, AASI (by now, MASG) offered the entire Jetcruzer project for auction, and sold it to Innova Aircraft in February 2004. Shortly after the purchase, Innova announced its intentions of offering a new version of the aircraft in kit form, marketed by a new subsidiary, Jetcruzer LLC. This will feature a modified wing to overcome the problems faced by the Jetcruzer 500, and will be powered by a pair of Pratt & Whitney Canada JT15D turbofans. It was expected to fly by late 2004 or early 2005, but development ceased before the flight can happen.

In 2017, all the aircraft and intellectual properties were acquired by Jetcruzer International, LLC., based in Ontario, California, and production resumed. All Jetcruzer components and subassemblies including wings, landing gear, fins, control surfaces and fittings are manufactured in the company's Ontario facility. The composite fuselage is subcontracted to a  composite manufacturing company currently producing advanced composite parts for the transport aerospace industry. A Jetcruzer 500E was restored with new avionics, electrical wirings and a new engine. The first flight of this aircraft is planned in September 2022.

Specifications (Jetcruzer 450)

See also

References

Citations

Bibliography

 Frawley, Gerard. The International Directory of Civil Aircraft. Aerospace Publications Pty Ltd, 1997 
 Taylor, Michael. (ed.) Brassey's World Aircraft & Systems Directory 1996/97. London: Brassey's (US) Ltd., 1996.

External links
AIN Online on the cruzer

Canard aircraft
1980s United States civil utility aircraft
Single-engined pusher aircraft
Aircraft first flown in 1989
Low-wing aircraft